The Visual Arts at the Edinburgh International Festival, 1947 to 1976 lists exhibitions during the first three decades of the festival. 

Although they were not featured in the first two festivals in 1947 and 1948, from 1949 the visual arts became an important feature with a series of exhibitions at the Royal Scottish Academy and the National Gallery of Scotland. 

During the first decade, they tended to be devoted to famous major artists—from Rembrandt to the Impressionists. While in the second and third decades, there were also ones showcasing particular collections, and national schools of artists. Archaeological treasures were shown at the Royal Scottish Museum, now known as the National Museum of Scotland, and some others were connected with the performing arts.

Galleries

Since the 19th-century, Edinburgh has enjoyed good facilities for showing the visual arts. During the first three decades, the Royal Scottish Academy was the main gallery used by the festival, hosting an least 22 exhibitions. The other main locations were the Royal Scottish Museum now known as the National Museum of Scotland, where eight exhibitions were held, and the National Gallery of Scotland which had five. Edinburgh College of Art and Waverley Market in Princes Street each held three exhibitions. The Scottish National Gallery of Modern Art, City of Edinburgh Art Gallery and the Fruit Market Gallery, Market Street each had 2 exhibitions. In addition there were at least another 10 places used for smaller exhibitions.

List of exhibitions

See also
Edinburgh International Festival
Opera at the Edinburgh International Festival: history and repertoire, 1947–1956
Opera at the Edinburgh International Festival: history and repertoire, 1957–1966
Opera at the Edinburgh International Festival: history and repertoire, 1967–1976
Ballet at the Edinburgh International Festival: history and repertoire, 1947–1956
Ballet at the Edinburgh International Festival: history and repertoire, 1957–1966
Ballet at the Edinburgh International Festival: history and repertoire, 1967–1976
Drama at the Edinburgh International Festival: history and repertoire, 1947–1956
Drama at the Edinburgh International Festival: history and repertoire, 1957–1966
Musicians at the Edinburgh International Festival, 1947 to 1956
Musicians at the Edinburgh International Festival, 1957–1966
World premieres at the Edinburgh International Festival

References

Edinburgh Festival